Chevy Van may refer to:

Chevrolet Express (current Chevrolet van)
Chevrolet Van (predecessor model of Chevrolet Express)
Chevrolet Beauville (passenger version of the aforementioned predecessor "van")
"Chevy Van" (song), a song by Sammy Johns

See also
GMC Savana (Similar to Chevrolet Express)
GMC Vandura (Predecessor of Savana, similar to Chevrolet Van)
GMC Rally (passenger version of Vandura)